Arnold Armitage (1899–1991) was a British-born artist and illustrator, best known for his work with pin-up art. He moved to the United States around 1925 and settled in Hollywood, California, working for the Foster and Kleiser Company, which produced billboards. During the 1930s, he developed a reputation as a designer specializing in billboards, and he designed many of these for American corporations.

About 1940, Armitage began a series of "pretty girl" paintings for the calendar market. While not strictly pin-ups, these works were very reminiscent of the work of Gil Elvgren. Armitage's pretty girls were well received in both the United States and England.

Sources
 http://www.artinfo.com/artists/profile/11508/arnold-armitage/

See also 
 Pin-up girl
 List of pinup artists

References
 The Great American Pin-Up, by Charles G. Martignette and Louis K. Meisel, 

American illustrators
Pin-up artists
1899 births
1991 deaths
Place of birth missing
British emigrants to the United States